Thousand Buddha Caves or Qianfo Grottoes may refer to the following Buddhist caves in China:

 Mogao Caves or Thousand Buddha Caves, Dunhuang
 Eastern Thousand Buddha Caves
 Western Thousand Buddha Caves
 Bezeklik Thousand Buddha Caves
 Kumtura Thousand Buddha Caves
 Kizil Caves or Kizil Thousand Buddha Caves